This is a list of Telugu-language films produced in the year 1975. Soggadu film has not been added in the list of 1975 films with date of release 19 Dec 1975 after a week of EDURULENI MANISHI with same director and music director.

1975

References

1975
Telugu
Telugu films